Eudesmia is a genus of lichen moths in the monotypic subtribe Eudesmiina of the family Erebidae. The genus was erected by Jacob Hübner in 1823.

Species
 Eudesmia arida (Skinner, 1906) – arid eudesmia moth
 Eudesmia laetifera (Walker, [1865])
 Eudesmia loccea (Schaus, 1921)
 Eudesmia lunaris (Walker, 1864)
 Eudesmia major Rothschild, 1912
 Eudesmia menea (Drury, 1782)
 Eudesmia mina (Guerin, 1844)
 Eudesmia monon Dyar, 1917
 Eudesmia praxis (Druce, 1894)
 Eudesmia prusias (Druce, 1894)
 Eudesmia quadrifasciata (Walker, [1865])
 Eudesmia ruficollis (Donovan, 1798)
 Eudesmia tehuacana Dyar, 1917
 Eudesmia trisigna (Walker, 1854)
 Eudesmia unicincta (Hampson, 1900)

References

 
Moth genera